Nora Ariffin is a Singaporean fashion model and real estate broker.

Education 
Ariffin studied at St. Margaret's Secondary School.

Modelling Career
While Ariffin was working at the Blue Ginger boutique, designer Kelvin Khoo took photos of her modelling clothes for the boutique. Eileen Abisheganaden who owned the boutique liked the photos and introduced her to Dick Lee, a partner at modelling agency Carrie Models.

She has appeared in campaigns for CoverGirl, alongside models including Rachel Hunter and Nikki Taylor, Lacoste, L'Oréal, and Chanel's Allure fragrance. Ariffin has also been featured in editorials for Vogue Paris and Italian Harper's Bazaar and graced the cover of Italian Cosmopolitan and Marie Claire (Singapore, Malaysia). Ariffin has worked with photographers including Guy Bourdin, Herb Ritts, and Gilles Bensimon.

Other career 
Ariffin is also a real estate broker since 2004 and is the senior vice-president of Halstead Property.

Personal life
Since 2011, Ariffin has been in a relationship with singer Duncan Sheik, having previously dated in 1999.

Filmography

References

External links
 
 
 Nora Ariffin - Instagram

Living people
Singaporean female models
Year of birth missing (living people)